KNKI (106.7 FM) is a radio station licensed to Pinetop-Lakeside, Arizona. The station broadcasts a talk/sports radio format and is owned by WSK Family Credit Shelter Trust UTA.

References

External links
 KNKI's official website

NKI
Talk radio stations in the United States